His Private Life is a 1928 American silent comedy film directed by Frank Tuttle and written by Ethel Doherty, George Marion Jr., Keene Thompson, and Ernest Vajda. The film stars Adolphe Menjou, Kathryn Carver, Margaret Livingston, Eugene Pallette, André Cheron, and Sybil Grove. The film was released on November 17, 1928, by Paramount Pictures.

Plot
In France, Georges St. Germain finds himself in love with Eleanor Kent, a nice American. Having discovered that she is a great friend of Yvette, his ex-girlfriend now the wife of the very jealous Henri Bérgère, Georges takes the initiative to go and stay in the Bérgère's hotel, hoping to be able to attend Eleanor without problems. Her move, however, is interpreted by Yvette as a flashback to her, which also triggers her husband's jealousy. Georges will be able to definitively conquer the beautiful American, despite the misunderstandings and jealousies aroused in spite of himself.

Cast
Adolphe Menjou as Georges St. Germain
Kathryn Carver as Eleanor Trent
Margaret Livingston as Yvette Bérgere
Eugene Pallette as Henri Bérgere
André Cheron as Maurice
Sybil Grove as Maid
Paul Guertzman as Stupid boy
Alex Melesh as Salesman
Alex Woloshin as Hotel clerk
Tania Akron as Pierette (uncredited)
Phillips Holmes as Pierrot (uncredited)
Lupino Lane as Bit Part (uncredited)

References

External links

1928 films
1920s English-language films
Silent American comedy films
1928 comedy films
Paramount Pictures films
Films directed by Frank Tuttle
American black-and-white films
American silent feature films
1920s American films